Otama Beach is a beach on the northeast coast of the Coromandel Peninsula, New Zealand, 20 km north of Whitianga.

The north-facing 2 km long white-sand beach is backed by a large protected natural dune system, separating it from the road and farm land beyond.  Access is via Black Jack Road, starting from State Highway 25 at Kuaotunu, which is sealed up to the start of Otama Beach.  It continues as a gravel road further east towards Opito Bay.

Otama Beach is almost completely undeveloped, with only a small number of houses, mostly holiday homes, dotted around the hills behind the eastern end of the beach. The white sand squeaks when walked on, and the beach is a very good swimming beach, occasionally with good conditions for surfing. The rolling dunes and the wetland nature reserve behind it are protected, containing delicate flora such as the rare sand tussock Austrofestuca littoralis, and nesting areas of the endangered New Zealand dotterel.

References

Thames-Coromandel District
Beaches of Waikato
Populated places in Waikato